Nordstrom is a chain of US department stores.

Nordstrom, Nordstrøm, or Nordström are surnames of Swedish origin.

Nordstrom 
 Dagmar Nordstrom (1903–1976), American composer, pianist, arranger, accompanist and harmony of the Nordstrom Sisters
 Frances Nordstrom, American actress and playwright.
 Marie Nordstrom, American actress.
 John W. Nordstrom (1871–1963), Swedish-born co-founder of the Nordstrom department store chain
 Siggie Nordstrom (1893–1980), American entertainer, lead singer of the Nordstrom Sisters
 Swede Nordstrom (1896–1963), American football player
 The Nordstrom Sisters (1931–1976), American sister act, international cabaret singers
Ursula Nordstrom (1910–1988), publisher and editor in chief of juvenile books at Harper & Row from 1940 to 1973.

Nordström
Anders Nordström, Swedish physician who served as Acting Director-General of the World Health Organization (WHO) 
Clara Nordström, German writer and translator of Swedish descent.
Ester Blenda Nordström (1891-1948), Swedish journalist, author and explorer 
Fredrik Nordström Swedish record producer and guitar player 
Gunnar Nordström (1881–1923), Finnish theoretical physicist 
Henrik Nordström (1891–1982), Swedish track and field athlete who competed in the 1912 Summer Olympics 
Jockum Nordström, Swedish artist
Karl Nordström (1855–1923), Swedish painter
Kjell Nordström (born 1949), Swedish politician
Kjell A. Nordström, Swedish economist, writer and public speaker
Lars-Gunnar Nordström (1924–2014), Finnish non-representational artist
Peter Nordström, Swedish professional ice hockey player. 
Sivar Nordström, Swedish orienteering competitor 
Tina Nordström, Swedish chef, television personality, and pitch lady

Nordstrøm
Rikard Nordstrøm (1893–1955), Danish gymnast who competed in the 1912 Summer Olympics

Other
Nordstrøm (band), Danish band
Nordström's theory of gravitation, two distinct theories proposed by the Finnish theoretical physicist Gunnar Nordström  
Reissner–Nordström metric, in physics and astronomy, a static solution to the Einstein field equations in empty space
Náströnd - Norse realm of hel.

See also 
 Norström

Swedish-language surnames